The men's high jump was an event at the 1992 Summer Olympics in Barcelona, Spain. There were 43 participating athletes from 27 nations. The maximum number of athletes per nation had been set at 3 since the 1930 Olympic Congress. The qualification mark was set at 2.29 metres (two + twelve athletes). The event was won by Javier Sotomayor of Cuba, the nation's first victory in the men's high jump. Patrik Sjöberg of Sweden earned silver, becoming the first (and, through the 2016 Games, only) man to win a third medal in the event, though he never won gold. Sweden was only the third country (after the United States and Soviet Union) to have three consecutive podium appearances. A three-way tie for third could not be resolved by countback, so bronze medals were awarded to Tim Forsyth (Australia's first medal in the event since 1956), Artur Partyka (Poland's first since 1980), and Hollis Conway (the United States reaching the podium in 20 of the 22 Olympic men's high jump competitions to date; Conway was the sixth man with two medals in the event).

Background

This was the 22nd appearance of the event, which is one of 12 athletics events to have been held at every Summer Olympics. The returning finalists from the 1988 Games were silver medalist Hollis Conway of the United States, bronze medalist (and 1984 silver medalist) Patrik Sjöberg of Sweden, fifth-place finisher Clarence Saunders of Bermuda, sixth-place finisher (and 1984 gold medalist Dietmar Mögenburg of West Germany, seventh-place finishers Dalton Grant of Great Britain and Igor Paklin of the Soviet Union (now the Unified Team), and fourteenth-place finisher Arturo Ortiz of Spain. Javier Sotomayor of Cuba, the world record holder, had been prevented from competing in 1984 and 1988 by boycotts; he finally had an opportunity to compete at the Olympics, and was favored. Sjöberg, the two-time Olympic medalist, 1987 world champion, and world record holder before Sotomayor, was also a contender. So were Americans Conway and Charles Austin (the reigning world champion).

The British Virgin Islands, Gabon, Jordan, Mauritius, Qatar, and the Seychelles each made their debut in the event; former Soviet republics appeared as the "Unified Team" and Yugoslav athletes competed as "Independent Olympic Participants". The United States made its 21st appearance, most of any nation, having missed only the boycotted 1980 Games.

Competition format

The competition used the two-round format introduced in 1912. There were two distinct rounds of jumping with results cleared between rounds. Jumpers were eliminated if they had three consecutive failures, whether at a single height or between multiple heights if they attempted to advance before clearing a height.

The qualifying round had the bar set at 2.00 metres, 2.05 metres, 2.10 metres, 2.15 metres, 2.20 metres, 2.23 metres, 2.26 metres, and 2.29 metres. All jumpers clearing 2.29 metres in the qualifying round advanced to the final. If fewer than 12 jumpers could achieve it, the top 12 (including ties) would advance to the final.

The final had jumps at 2.15 metres, 2.20 metres, 2.24 metres, 2.28 metres, 2.31 metres, 2.34 metres, 2.37 metres, and 2.39 metres.

Records

These were the standing world and Olympic records (in metres) prior to the 1992 Summer Olympics.

Schedule

All times are Central European Summer Time (UTC+2)

Results

Qualifying round

Qualification: Qualifying Performance 2.29 (Q) or at least 12 best performers (q) advance to the final. With 14 athletes clearing 2.26 metres, many chose not to even attempt (or to take only one attempt) at 2.29 metres (knowing that as long as at least 3 men did so, all of those who had achieved 2.26 metres would advance).

Final

The final was held on August 2, 1992.

See also
1990 Men's European Championships High Jump
1991 Men's World Championships High Jump
1993 Men's World Championships High Jump

References

External links
 Official Report
 Results

H
High jump at the Olympics
Men's events at the 1992 Summer Olympics